5"/51 caliber guns (spoken "five-inch-fifty-one-caliber") initially served as the secondary battery of United States Navy battleships built from 1907 through the 1920s, also serving on other vessels. United States naval gun terminology indicates the gun fired a projectile  in diameter, and the barrel was 51 calibers long.

Description
The different marks of the gun were Marks 7, 8, 9, 14, and 15. The built-up gun consisted of a tube, full-length jacket, and single hoop with side swing Welin breech block and Smith-Asbury mechanism for a total weight of about 5 metric tons. Some Marks included a tapered liner. Useful life expectancy was 900 effective full charges (EFC) per liner.

US service

The 5-inch/51 caliber gun was designed to engage destroyers, torpedo boats, and other surface targets. The 5"/51 gun entered service in 1911 as secondary armament on the s, which mounted 16.  The guns served well through World War I, but increased awareness of the need for anti-aircraft protection (especially following the attack on Pearl Harbor) encouraged mounting of dual-purpose 5"/38 caliber guns in later battleships, and some of the World War I-era battleships were rearmed with dual purpose guns as well. Surplus 5"/51 guns from scrapped or rearmed battleships were mounted in United States Coast Guard cutters, auxiliaries, small aircraft carriers, coast defense batteries, and Defensively Equipped Merchant Ships. A 1939 Table of Organization and Equipment shows Marine defense battalions were equipped with six of these guns each. 5-inch/51 shore batteries were used with great effectiveness by the 1st Marine Defense Battalion during the Battle of Wake Island in December 1941. These were replaced in the defense battalions by the 155 mm Long Tom gun by 1943. Six s were rearmed with "wet mount" 5-inch/51 guns during World War II, taken from Barracuda-class submarines or spares for that class.

The 5"/51 caliber gun was mounted on:

  - replacing 10 5"/40 and 4 8"/35 guns in 1917
  - replacing 2 5"/50 and 4 3"/50 guns in 1917
  - replacing 2 5"/50 and 4 3"/50 guns in 1917
  - replacing 2 5"/50 and 4 3"/50 guns in 1917
 
 
 
 
  (Gun nos. 489–509)
  (Gun nos. 468–488)
 
 
 
 
 
 
 
 
 
 
 
 
 Five s:
 
 
 
 
 
 
 
 
 
 
 
 
 
 
 
 s
 s
 s
 s (USCG Lake class cutters)
 s

Army coast defense use
5"/51 caliber ex-Navy guns were emplaced during World War II at several locations, some operated by the United States Army Coast Artillery Corps and some by Marine defense battalions. This list may not be exhaustive. They were grouped into two-gun batteries unless otherwise noted.

 Two guns near Cape Lookout, NC
 Three guns in Battery Gillespie, Point Loma, San Diego, CA
 Three guns in Battery Ahua, Fort Kamehameha, Oahu, HI
 Two guns in Battery Nanakuli, Oahu, HI
 Two guns in Battery Oneula (Ewa), Oahu, HI
 Two guns at Kahana Bay, North Shore, Oahu, HI

British service
In British service these guns were known as 5"/51 BL Mark VI and Mark VII. During World War I three of these guns formed part of the coastal defences of Scapa Flow.
In World War II a small number of these guns entered British service on board ships transferred under the Lend-Lease arrangement. Some of these guns were then transferred to New Zealand (at least six, possibly more) and deployed ashore for coastal defence.

Surviving examples
Surviving 5"/51 caliber guns include:
 Six guns preserved on  near Houston, Texas
 One Mark 8 gun (Four Lakes #1205) at Trumbo Point, Key West, Florida (part of Naval Air Station Key West)
 Two Mark 7 guns (Watervliet #774 and #Unk.) on Midway Island, Central Pacific Ocean
 One Mark 7 gun (Naval Gun Factory (NGF) #415L) at the NROTC facility, Tulane University, New Orleans, Louisiana
 One Mark 15 gun (NGF #736L) at the U.S. Navy Museum, Washington Navy Yard, Washington, DC (previously on )
 One 5"/51 caliber gun at Fort Schuyler, Bronx, New York (possibly at USMMA, Kings Point, New York)
 One 5"/51 caliber gun at Treasure Island, San Francisco, California (behind museum)
 One Mark 15 gun in Lewiston, Maine
 One Mark 15 gun (Bethlehem #Unk.) at the Brunswick Executive Airport, Brunswick, Maine (formerly NAS Brunswick)
 One 5"/51 caliber gun in Mitchell, Indiana
 One Mark 9 Mod 3 gun (NGF #938L), American Military Museum, South El Monte, California
 One 5"/51 caliber gun at the Veterans Memorial Museum, Chehalis, WA

See also

Weapons of comparable role, performance and era 
 BL 4.7-inch 45-calibre naval gun : British equivalent
 12 cm/45 3rd Year Type naval gun : Japanese equivalent

Notes

References

External links
 List of all US coastal forts and batteries at the Coast Defense Study Group, Inc. website
 FortWiki, lists most CONUS and Canadian forts

World War II naval weapons
World War I naval weapons
Naval guns of the United States
127 mm artillery
Coastal artillery